Lake View Park (also known as Rawal Lake View Point or Rawal Lake Promenade) is a wildlife park, amusement park and adventure park located near Malpur village at the edge of Rawal lake in Islamabad, Pakistan. It runs under the administration of Capital Development Authority.

The park contains the third-largest walk-in bird aviary in the world, which was inaugurated in 2013. It is 80 feet high, and covers 3.8 acres. 4,000 birds belonging to 300 different species are housed here

Public services 
Some of the facilities here include:
Sitting pagoda
Picnic point
Ibex club, rock climbing gym
Motor sports ranch
Fancy aviary
Festival arena
Passenger road train
Paintball battlefield
Boating arena on Saturday
Fishing area
Horse riding mobs
Swimming pool
Children play area
Carousel
M1 Traxx

See also
 List of parks and gardens in Pakistan
 Simly Dam
 Rawal Lake
 Pakistan Monument
 Rose and Jasmine Garden
 Faisal Mosque
 Margalla Hills

References 

Parks in Pakistan
Zoos in Pakistan
Islamabad
Tourist attractions in Islamabad
Articles needing infobox zoo

Amusement parks in Pakistan 
Adventure parks 
Safari parks 
 
Wildlife parks in Pakistan